The 2013–14 ACC men's basketball season began with practices in October 2013, followed by the start of the 2013–14 NCAA Division I men's basketball season in November. Conference play started in early January 2014 and concluded in March with the 2014 ACC men's basketball tournament at the Greensboro Coliseum in Greensboro.  The 2013–14 season marked the first season for three new additions to the conference from the Big East: Notre Dame, Pittsburgh, and Syracuse. It was also the final ACC season for conference charter member Maryland, which left after the season for the Big Ten Conference.

Pre-season

() first place votes

Pre-season All-ACC teams

Coaches select 8 players
Players in bold are choices for ACC Player of the Year

Rankings

Conference schedules

Conference matrix
This table summarizes the head-to-head results between teams in conference play during the regular season. Records in parentheses are head-to-head results between teams in conference play during the regular season and in the post-season conference tournament.

Boston College

|-
!colspan=9 style="background:#8B0000; color:#F0E68C;"| ACC regular season

|-
!colspan=12 style="text-align: center; background:#8B0000"|2014 ACC tournament

Clemson

|-
!colspan=9 style="background:#522D80; color:#F66733;"| ACC regular season

|-
!colspan=9 style="background:#522D80;"| 2014 ACC tournament

Duke

|-
!colspan=9 style="background:#00009C; color:#FFFFFF;"| ACC regular season
|-

|-
!colspan=12 style="text-align: center; background:#00009C"|2014 ACC tournament

|-
!colspan=12 style="text-align: center; background:#00009C"|2014 NCAA tournament

Florida State

|-
!colspan=9 style="background:#540115; color:#CDC092;"| ACC regular season
|-

|-
!colspan=12 style="text-align: center; background:#540115"|2014 ACC tournament

Georgia Tech

|-
!colspan=9 style="background:#D4AF37; color:#000080;"| ACC regular season
|-

|-
!colspan=9 style="background:#D4AF37; color:white;"| ACC men's basketball tournament

Maryland

|-
!colspan=9 style="background:#CE1126; color:#FCD116;"| ACC regular season
|-

|-
!colspan=12 style="background:#CE1126; color:#FCD116;"| 2014 ACC tournament'''

Miami

|-
!colspan=9 style="background:#005030; color:#F47321;"| ACC regular season
|-

|-
!colspan=9 style="background:#005030;"| 2014 ACC tournament

North Carolina

|-
!colspan=9 style="background:#56A0D3; color:#FFFFFF;"| ACC regular season
|-

|-
!colspan=12 style="background:#56A0D3; color:#FFFFFF;"| 2014 ACC tournament

|-
!colspan=12 style="background:#56A0D3; color:#FFFFFF;"| 2014 NCAA tournament

N.C. State

|-
!colspan=9 style="background:#E00000; color:#FFFFFF;"| ACC regular season
|-

|-
!colspan=9 style="background:#E00000;"| 2014 ACC tournament

|-
!colspan=9 style="background:#E00000;"| 2014 NCAA tournament

Notre Dame

|-
!colspan=9 style="background:#CC9933; color:#002649;"| ACC regular season

|-
!colspan=9 style="background:#CC9933;"| 2014 ACC tournament

Pittsburgh

|-
!colspan=9 style="background:#091C44; color:#CEC499;"| ACC regular season

|-
!colspan=9 style="background:#091C44;"| 2014 ACC tournament

|-
!colspan=9 style="background:#091C44;"| 2014 NCAA tournament

Syracuse

|-
!colspan=9 style="background:#FF6F00; color:#212B6D;"| ACC regular season

|-
!colspan=9 style="background:#FF6F00;"| 2014 ACC tournament

|-
!colspan=9 style="background:#FF6F00;"| 2014 NCAA tournament

Virginia

|-
!colspan=9 style="background:#0D3268; color:#FF7C00;"| ACC regular season

|-
!colspan=9 style="background:#0D3268;"| 2014 ACC tournament

|-
!colspan=9 style="background:#0D3268;"| 2014 NCAA tournament

Virginia Tech

|-
!colspan=9 style="background:#660000; color:#CC5500;"| ACC regular season

|-
!colspan=9 style="background:#660000;"| 2014 ACC tournament

Wake Forest

|-
!colspan=9 style="background:#CFB53B; color:#000000;"| ACC regular season

|-
!colspan=9 style="background:#CFB53B;"| 2014 ACC tournament

Player of the week
Players of the week
Throughout the conference regular season, the Atlantic Coast Conference offices named one or two players of the week and one or two freshmen of the week each Monday.

Honors and awards

All-Americans

All-ACC awards and teams

Coaches

Postseason

ACC tournament

  March 12–16, 2014 Atlantic Coast Conference Basketball Tournament, Greensboro Coliseum, Greensboro.

NCAA tournament

References